The Battle of Santiago was the second major battle of the Dominican War of Independence and was fought on the 30 March 1844, at Santiago de los Caballeros, Santiago Province. Although outnumbered, Dominican troops, part of the Army of The North and led by General José María Imbert, defeated Haitian Army troops led by General Jean-Louis Pierrot.

References

Bibliography

See also
 Battle of Cabeza de Las Marías 
 Battle of Azua 
 Battle of El Memiso 
 Battle of Tortuguero 
 Battle of Estrelleta 
 Battle of Beler 
 Battle of El Número 
 Battle of Las Carreras

Santiago 1844
Santiago 1844
Santiago 1844
1844 in the Dominican Republic